Weare Reservoir is a  impoundment on the Piscataquog River in Hillsborough County in southern New Hampshire, United States, in the town of Weare. The reservoir is also known as Lake Horace.

It is classified as a warmwater fishery, with observed species including rainbow trout, brown trout, smallmouth and largemouth bass, chain pickerel, horned pout, and black crappie.

See also

List of lakes in New Hampshire

References

Lakes of Hillsborough County, New Hampshire
Reservoirs in New Hampshire
Weare, New Hampshire